Mengel is a surname. Notable people with the surname include:

 Alex Mengel (1950–1985), Guyanese-born suspected serial killer
 Charles Mengel (born 1933), Australian cricketer
 Christian Gotlob Mengel (1716–1769), Danish publisher, translator and bookseller
 Ernest Mengel (1913–1968), Luxembourgian footballer
 Friederike Mengel (born 1979), German economist 
 Georg Mengel (1612–1667), German composer
 Hans Mengel (1917–1943), German footballer
 Levi Walter Mengel (1868–1941), American entomologist

See also
 Northern Territory v Mengel, an Australian court case
 Mengele (disambiguation)